The following table of contents for the Book of Leinster is based on the diplomatic edition by R.I. Best and M.A. O'Brien. The contents are listed according to the folio number of the manuscript and the page and volume number of the edition. The names of poets assigned in the Book of Leinster are here followed by (ascr.) (for 'ascribed') and need not represent genuine authorship.

Diplomatic edition vol 1

Diplomatic edition vol 2

Diplomatic edition vol 3

Diplomatic edition vol 4

Diplomatic edition vol 5

Notes

Sources

Early Irish literature